This is a list of Odia films that are scheduled to release in 2023.

List of Odia films produced in the Ollywood in India that are released in the year 2023.

Films

References

Lists of 2023 films by country or language

Lists of Ollywood films by year